Matthew Flomo is a Liberian politician. , he is the Acting Minister of Health and Social Welfare, and the Deputy Minister for Administration.

References

Living people
Year of birth missing (living people)
Place of birth missing (living people)
Government ministers of Liberia
21st-century Liberian politicians